Sharpton is a surname. Notable people with the surname include:

 Al Sharpton (born 1954), American Baptist minister
 Virgil L. Sharpton (born 1948), American professor
 Darryl Sharpton (born 1988), American football player